Kristof is both a given name and a surname. Notable people with the name include:

People with the given name Kristof:

 Kristof Beyens (born 1983), Belgian sprint athlete
 Kristof Imschoot (born 1980), Belgian footballer
 Kristof Maes (born 1988), Belgian goalkeeper
 Kristof Ongenaet (21st century), Belgian basketball player
 Kristof Snelders (born 1982), Belgian professional football player
 Kristof Vizvary (born 1983), professional handball player
 Kristof Vliegen (born 1982), Belgian tennis player

People with the surname Kristof:

 Agota Kristof (1935–2011), Hungarian-born Swiss writer
 Emory Kristof (born 1942), American photographer
 Nicholas D. Kristof (born 1959), American journalist

See also
 Kristoff (disambiguation) 

Dutch masculine given names